The 1897 Wyoming Cowboys football team represented the University of Wyoming as an independent during the 1897 college football season.  In its fourth season under head coach Justus F. Soule, a professor of Latin and Greek, the team compiled a perfect 2–0 record, consisting of victories over a team made up of the school's alumni and the Cheyenne High School team. Harry Houston was the team captain. In the program's first four years under coach Soule (1894-1897), the football team compiled an 8-0 record and outscored opponents by a total of 148 to 26.

Schedule

References

Wyoming
Wyoming Cowboys football seasons
College football undefeated seasons
Wyoming Cowboys football